Juan Valdez (1938 - August 25, 2012) was a land grant activist who fired the first shot during a 1967 New Mexico courthouse raid that grabbed international attention & helped spark the Chicano Movement.

Biography
Valdez was born in 1938 in Rio Arriba County, New Mexico.

Heir to a northern New Mexico land grant, Valdez was 29 years old when he and a group of land grant advocates, led by Reies Lopez Tijerina, raided a Rio Arriba County courthouse in Tierra Amarilla. Their goal was to attempt a citizens' arrest of then-District Attorney Alfonso Sanchez over Hispanic land rights issues.

Valdez had gotten involved with Tijerina's group, known as Alianza Federal de Mercedes — an organization founded to help Mexican-American heirs to old Spanish land grants reclaim land that was illegally taken by white settlers and the U.S. government.

"Tijerina impressed me when he and most of the people who had walked from Albuquerque set up a camp and refused to leave," Valdez told retired lawyer Mike Scarborough in the book "Trespassers On Our Own Land," an oral history of the Valdez family. During the raid, it was Valdez who shot and wounded state police officer Nick Saiz after the officer went for his pistol and refused commands by Valdez to put his hands up. "It came down to, I shoot him or he was going to shoot me — so I pulled the trigger," Valdez said in the book. "Lucky for both of us, he didn't die." The raiders also beat a deputy and took a sheriff and reporter hostage. After holding the courthouse for a couple of hours, the armed group fled to the mountains as the National Guard and armored tanks chased them.

Valdez was convicted of assault but was later pardoned by Gov. Bruce King. The episode cemented Valdez & Tijerina's legacy among activists from the Chicano Movement of the 1970s who favored more radical methods of fighting discrimination over those of the moderate Mexican American civil rights leaders a generation before.

"He loved the attention," said daughter Juanita Montoya, 48. "He wanted people to know our history and what happened to our land." He died peacefully at his Canjilon ranch after recently suffering two heart attacks according to Montoya.

References

External links

American activists
1938 births
2012 deaths
People from Rio Arriba County, New Mexico